Palaiosofos is a small village in Cyprus, located southeast of Lapithos. De facto, it is under the control of Northern Cyprus.

References 

Communities in Kyrenia District
Populated places in Girne District